The 2017 Southeastern Conference men's basketball tournament is the postseason men's basketball tournament for the Southeastern Conference held at Bridgestone Arena in Nashville, Tennessee March 8–12, 2017.

Seeds

Schedule

Bracket

* denotes overtime period

See also

 2017 SEC women's basketball tournament

Notes

References

2016–17 Southeastern Conference men's basketball season
SEC men's basketball tournament
Basketball competitions in Nashville, Tennessee
College sports tournaments in Tennessee
SEC